A lightvessel, or lightship, is a ship that acts as a lighthouse. They are used in waters that are too deep or otherwise unsuitable for lighthouse construction. Although some records exist of fire beacons being placed on ships in Roman times, the first modern lightvessel was off the Nore sandbank at the mouth of the River Thames in England, placed there by its inventor Robert Hamblin in 1734. The type has become largely obsolete; lighthouses replaced some stations as the construction techniques for lighthouses advanced, while large, automated buoys replaced others.

Construction

A crucial element of lightvessel design is the mounting of a light on a sufficiently tall mast. Initially, it consisted of oil lamps that could be run up the mast and lowered for servicing. Later vessels carried fixed lamps which were serviced in place. Fresnel lenses were used as they became available, and many vessels housed them in small versions of the lanterns used in lighthouses. Some lightships had two masts, the second holding a reserve beacon in case the main light failed.

Initially, the hulls were constructed of wood, with lines like those of other small merchant ships. This proved unsatisfactory for a ship that was permanently anchored, and the shape of the hull evolved to reduce rolling and pounding. As iron and steel were used in other ships, so were they used in lightvessels, and the advent of steam and diesel power led to self-propelled and electrically lighted designs. Earlier vessels had to be towed to and from their positions.

Much of the rest of the ship was taken up by storage (for oil and other supplies) and crew accommodations. The crew's primary duty was, of course, to maintain the light; but they also kept records of passing ships, observed the weather, and sometimes performed rescues.

In the early 20th century, some lightships were fitted with warning bells, either mounted on the structure or lowered into the water, the purpose of which was to warn of danger in poor visibility and to permit crude estimation of the lightship relative to the approaching vessel.

Mooring

Holding the vessel in position was an important aspect of lightvessel engineering. Early lightships used fluke anchors, which are still in use on many contemporary vessels. These were not very satisfactory, since a lightship has to remain stationary in very rough seas which other vessels can avoid, and these anchors are prone to dragging.

Since the early 19th century, lightships have used mushroom anchors, named for their shape, which typically weigh 3-4 tons. They were invented by Robert Stevenson. The first lightvessel equipped with one was an 82-ton converted fishing boat, renamed Pharos, which entered service on 15 September 1807 near to Bell Rock, and had a 1.5 ton anchor.  The effectiveness of these anchors improved dramatically in the 1820s, when cast iron anchor chains were introduced (the rule of thumb being 6 feet of chain for every foot depth of water).

Appearance

As well as the light, which operated in the fog and also at night, from one hour before sunset to one hour after sunrise, early lightvessels were equipped with red (or very occasionally white) day markers at the tops of masts, which were the first objects seen from an approaching ship. The designs varied, filled circles or globes, and pairs of inverted cones being the most common among them.

Later lightships, for purposes of visibility, normally had bright red hulls which displayed the name of the station in white, upper-case letters; relief light vessels displayed the word RELIEF instead. A few ships had differently coloured hulls. For example, the Huron Lightship was painted black since she was assigned the black buoy side of the entrance to the Lake Huron Cut. The lightvessel that operated at Minots Ledge, Cohasset, Massachusetts, from 1854 until 1860 had a light yellow hull to make it visible against the blue-green seas and the green hills behind it.

Lightvessel service

British lightships

David Avery and Robert Hamblin in 1731 placed the earliest British lightship at The Nore near the mouth of the River Thames. This was a private venture that operated profitably and without the need for government enforcement of payment for lighting services.

Further vessels were placed off Norfolk in 1736, at Owers Bank in Sussex in 1788, and at the Goodwin Sands in 1793.

Over time, Trinity House, the public authority charged with establishing and maintaining lighthouses in England and Wales, crowded out the private light vessels. Trinity House is now responsible for all the remaining lightvessels England and Wales, of which there are currently eight unmanned lightvessels and two smaller light floats.

In the 1930s, "crewless lightships" were proposed as a way to operate a light vessel for six to twelve months without a crew.<ref>"Crewless Lightship Is New Flying Dutchman" Popular Mechanics, December 1932</ref>

The first lightvessel conversion to solar power was made in 1995, and all vessels except the '20 class' have now been converted. The '20 class' is a slightly larger type of vessel that derives its power from diesel electric generators. Where a main light with a visible range in excess of 20 nautical miles (37 km) is required, a '20 class' vessel is used, as the main light from a Trinity House solar lightvessel has a maximum range of 19 nautical miles (35 km).

Hull numbers: 19, 22, 23 and 25 (the 20 class); 2, 5, 6, 7, 9, 10, 17 (solar lightvessels); and LF2 and LF3 (solar lightfloats).

American lightships

History
The first United States lightship was established  at Chesapeake Bay in 1820, and the total number around the coast peaked in 1909 with 56 locations marked. Of those ships, 168 were constructed by the United States Lighthouse Service and six by the United States Coast Guard, which absorbed it in 1939.  From 1820 until 1983, there were 179 lightships built for the U.S. government, and they were assigned to 116 separate light stations on four coasts (including the Great Lakes).

The first United States lightships were small wooden vessels with no propelling power.  The first United States iron-hulled lightship was stationed at Merrill's Shell Bank, Louisiana, in 1847.  Wood was still the preferred building material at the time because of lower cost and ability to withstand shock loading.  Wooden lightships often survived more than 50 years in northern waters where the danger of rotting was reduced.  Lightvessel 16 guarded Sandy Hook and Ambrose stations for more than 80 years; she had both an inner hull and an outer hull with the space between filled with salt to harden the wood and reduce decay.  Several lightships built with composite wood and steel hulls in 1897 proved less durable than either wood or steel.  The first modern steel lightship in United States service was lightvessel 44 built in 1882.  One of the last United States wooden hulled lightships built, lightvessel 74, went into service at Portland, Maine, in 1902.  The first United States lightships with steam engine propulsion were built in 1891 for service on the Great Lakes where seasonal ice required prompt evacuation of light stations to avoid destruction of the lightships.

The official use of lightships in the United States ended on March 29, 1985, when the United States Coast Guard decommissioned its last such ship, the Nantucket I. Many lightships were replaced with Texas Towers or large navigational buoysboth of which are cheaper to operate than lightvessels. In fact, lighthouses often replaced lightships.

Naming and numbering
The naming and numbering of American lightships is often confusing. Up to and through the Civil War lightships were identified by name, usually that of the station where they served. As they were moved from station to station, however, the keeping of records became hopelessly tangled. Therefore, in 1867 all existing lightships were given numbers by which they would be permanently identified, and the station at which they were presently serving was painted on their sides, to be changed as needed. Lightships held in reserve to serve in place of those in dock for maintenance were labeled "RELIEF". Surviving lightships are commonly taken to be named according to these labels, but for instance the "Lightship Chesapeake" actually served at two other stations as well as being used for examinations, and last served at the Delaware Light Station. In another case, the LV-114 was labeled "NEW BEDFORD", though there has never been such a station. In an attempt to sort out the early lightships, they were assigned one or two letter designations sometime around 1930; these identifications do not appear in early records, and they are to some degree uncertain.

There are three different and overlapping series of hull numbers. The Lighthouse Service assigned numbers beginning with "LV-" and starting from 1; however, not all numbers were used. When the Coast Guard took over the lighthouse service, all existing lightships were renumbered with "WAL-" prefixes, beginning with "WAL-501". In 1965 they were renumbered again, this time with "WLV-"; however in this case the numbers given were not sequential. Given that only six vessels were constructed after the Coast Guard takeover, the "LV-" series numbers are most commonly used.

Surviving American lightships

It is estimated that there are 15 United States lightships left today. Among them:

 The lightship Barnegat (LV-79) is moored in Camden, New Jersey. She was the lightship for Five Fathom Bank and Barnegat, New Jersey.
 The lightship Swiftsure (LV-83) is moored at Northwest Seaport in Seattle, Washington. She served at all five Pacific Coast lightship stations (Blunts Reef and San Francisco, California; and the Columbia River entrance, Umatilla Reef, and Swiftsure Bank, Washington).
 The lightship Ambrose (LV-87) is moored at the South Street Seaport Museum in New York City, New York.
 The lightship Portsmouth (LV-101) is moored at the naval shipyard museum in Portsmouth, Virginia. LV-101 was built in 1915 by Pusey & Jones. She first served at Cape Charles, Virginia, then Relief, Overfalls, Delaware, and Stonehorse Shoal, Massachusetts. After being decommissioned, she was stored in Portland, Maine, before being sold to the museum. Today LV-101 is dry docked and lettered as Portsmouth, having never served there.
 The lightship Huron (LV-103) is one of many that have plied the waters of the Great Lakes.Sellman, John J. Martin Reef: Lightship to Lighthouse. Cedarville, MI: Les Cheneaux Historical Association, 1995. In 1832 the first Lightship on the Great Lakes—the Lois McLain—was placed at Waugoshance Shoal.  After 1940, the Huron was the last lightship on the Great Lakes.  She was decommissioned in 1970 and grounded at Port Huron, Michigan as a museum.  The smallest surviving lightship, she is now a museum and a representative of the 96 foot class.
 The lightship Winter Quarter (LV-107) is moored at Liberty Landing Marina in Jersey City, New Jersey. She serves as the office building for a sailing school. 
 The lightship Nantucket (LV-112) is moored in Boston, Massachusetts.
 The lightship Frying Pan (LV-115) is moored at Pier 66 in New York City, New York.
 The lightship Chesapeake (LV-116) is moored at Historic Ships in Baltimore in Baltimore, Maryland.
 The lightship Overfalls (LV-118) is moored in Lewes, Delaware. She has been painted for the "OVERFALLS" station, though she never served there.
 The lightship Columbia (WLV-604) is moored at the Columbia River Maritime Museum in Astoria, Oregon. The first lightship on the Pacific Coast, she marked the entrance to the Columbia River.
 The lightship Relief (WLV-605) is moored at Jack London Square in Oakland, California.
 The lightship Nantucket I (WLV-612) is moored in New Bedford, Massachusetts. She operates as a floating hotel and events venue. Built in 1950 and operated at various stations from 1951 to 1983, she was designated Nantucket I in 1979 and rotated at the Nantucket station with the Nantucket II until 1983.  She was the last American lightship to be decommissioned in 1985.
 The lightship Nantucket II (WLV-613) is moored in New Bedford, Massachusetts.  She was the last lightship built in the United States and was laid down on February 4, 1952, at the Coast Guard Yard in Curtis Bay, Maryland. She was launched six months later and placed in service in September of the same year. Her first assignment was to the Ambrose Shoals off New York City and served at that station until 1967.  After brief service as a relief lightship, she was assigned as one of two Nantucket lightships and served at that station until replaced by a buoy on December 20, 1983. She was moored at the Wareham Shipyard in Wareham, Massachusetts from about 1990 until 2014.

German lightships

There are currently three identical unmanned German lightvessels in service, named FS1, FS3 and FS4. The initialism FS is short for Feuerschiff, which means lightvessel in German. Two of them are normally located at:
  German Bight (GB in charts and notices, G—B on vessels)
  German Bight Western Approach (GW/EMS)

Both positions have the same characteristics:
 white isophase light with a cycle period of 8s at 12m elevation and a range of 17 nautical miles
 foghorn with morse code R and 30s cycle period
 radar beacon with morse code TAll three ships are operated by the Waterways and Shipping Office Wilhelmshaven and can be seen in the harbour of Wilhelmshaven during maintenance.

Russian lightships

In Russia, lightships have been documented since the mid 19th century. The lightvessel service was subordinated to the Russian Hydrographic Office and most of the lightships under it were in the Baltic Sea. In the early 1900s there were about ten lightships in the Russian sector of the Baltics. Among these the following may be mentioned:Yelaginsky, located on the Yelagin Channellater moved to the Petrovsky Channel and renamed, Nevsky in the middle of the main channel to St. Petersburg, and Londonsky on Londonsky Shoal off Kotlin Island on the approach to Kronstadt. Other Baltic lightships were located further to the West, with Werkommatala by Primorsk (Koivisto) harbour, Lyserortsky at the entrance of the Gulf of Finland, and Nekmangrund over the treacherous shoals off Hiiumaa Island's NW shore, known as Hiiu Madal in Estonian.

Another well-known lightship was Irbensky of the Soviet Union era. It was the next-to-last Russian lightship. Having been located in the Baltic in the 1980s, it was briefly renamed Ventspilssky while serving near Ventspils port in the Latvian Socialist Soviet Republic.

The last Russian lightvessel in service was Astrakhansky-priyomniy, of the same class as Irbensky. Until 1997 she was marking the deepwater channel leading to Astrakhan harbour while it was doing service in the Caspian Sea.

 Other countries 

The Australian lightship Carpentaria, an unmanned lightvessel (effectively a floating lighthouse) built during 1916–17 in Sydney, operated in the Gulf of Carpentaria, off Sandy Cape, Queensland, and in the Bass Strait. After her career ended in 1985, she was donated to the Australian National Maritime Museum in 1987 for preservation.

Lost lightships
Because lightvessels must remain anchored in specific positions for the majority of their time at sea, they are more at risk of damage or destruction. Many lightships have been lost in hurricanes.
United States
 Lightship No. 85 (135 feet long, weighing 683 tons), lies sunk since 1997 in a shallow section of New York Harbor and its two masts are still visible above the surface.
 Lightship LV-82 Buffalo foundered in Lake Erie near Buffalo, during the Great Lakes Storm of 1913 with the loss of six lives.  See Shipwrecks of the 1913 Great Lakes storm and List of victims of the 1913 Great Lakes storm.
 Lightship No. 61 "Corsica Shoals" was destroyed in the same storm  on Lake Huron as Lightship 82.  See Huron Lightship for further details.
 LV-6 and LV-73 were both lost with all hands.
 The Nantucket Lightship LV-117 was rammed and sunk in 1934 by RMS Olympic homing in on its radio beacon, with a loss of seven out of a crew of eleven.
 Lightship No. 114 (WAL-536), built by Albina Engine & Machine Works, served as an active lightship from 1930 to 1971.  Her last assignment was at Portland, Maine.  In 1975 she was purchased by the city of New Bedford, Massachusetts and had "NEW BEDFORD" painted on her sides (despite the fact there never was a New Bedford lightship).  She was never adequately maintained and her hull decayed due to years of neglect.  She remained in New Bedford until she sank at her mooring on May 31, 2006.  She was deemed beyond repair and was sold for scrap.

Popular cultureLightship, a 1934 novel by Archie Binns.Men of the Lightship, a 1940 British propaganda film produced during World War II.
 The Lightship, a translation of the 1960 short story Das Feuerschiff by Siegfried Lenz.
 The Lightship, a 1985 film adapted from the Lenz novel, with Robert Duvall and Klaus Maria Brandauer.
 The Lightship, a 1963 West German film adapted from the Lenz novel, with James Robertson Justice.
Lillie Lightship: A fictional lightship from the children's television series TUGS.
 Lightship, a 2007 children's picture book by Brian Floca.  A Richard Jackson Book: Atheneum Books for Young Readers. Simon & Schuster Children's Books A Junior Library Guild Selection.  .
 In the 1990s, the Boston Beer Company produced a light beer that was called Lightship, with a picture of a 19th-century lightship in rough seas on the label.  The line has since been discontinued with the advent of Sam Adams Light.
 In the 2015 video game Sunless Sea, the player can visit several lightships moored around the game's world, an underground body of water called the Unterzee.

See also

 Lists of lighthouses
 Lists of lightvessels
 Lighthouse tender

 References 

Further reading
 United States Coast Guard, Aids to Navigation, (Washington, DC: U. S. Government Printing Office, 1945).
 
 Putnam, George R., Lighthouses and Lightships of the United States, (Boston: Houghton Mifflin Co., 1933).

 Clark, Liam. Light in the darkness - a history of lightships and the people who served on them''. (Amberley, 2016)

External links

1926 Christmas on a lightship.
Floca, Brian, Lightship, youtube video.
Information about lightships 
Trinity House lightvessels
Lightship Service in Russian Waters
Lightship day markers
Lightship anchors
Stevenson's Bell Rock lighthouse
Buffalo Harbor LV82
Lightship Frying Pan in New York City
"Aboard Lightship Five-Fathoms", December 1931, Popular Mechanics
Ambrose lightship at New York City's South Street Seaport Museum
U. S. Coast Guard's "Lightships of the U. S. Government" site
HNSA Ship Page: Lightship Overfalls, Lewes, Delaware
Huron Lightship page from Terry Pepper's Seeing the Light.
Information on the Huron Lightship from the Port Huron Museum (including hours and a virtual tour of the Lightship.)
Storbrotten lightship, YouTube.

 
Navigational aids
Ships of the United States Lighthouse Service